Rhizotrogus pallidipennis is a species of beetle in the Melolonthinae subfamily that is endemic to Balearic Islands.

References

Beetles described in 1850
pallidipennis
Endemic fauna of the Balearic Islands
Beetles of Europe